The 2002 Cupa României Final was the 64th final of Romania's most prestigious cup competition. The final was played at the Stadionul Național in Bucharest on 5 June 2002 and was contested between Divizia A sides Rapid București and Dinamo București. The cup was won by Rapid.

Route to the final

Match details

References

External links
 Official site 

Cupa Romaniei Final, 2002
2001-02
2002
2002